Camaegeria aristura is a moth of the family Sesiidae. It is known from Uganda.

This species is black and the tip of the abdomen has red-orange scales. It is similar to Camaegeria auripicta Strand, 1914, Camaegeria monogama (Meyrick, 1932) and Camaegeria sophax  (Druce, 1899)

References

Endemic fauna of Uganda
Sesiidae
Moths described in 1931
Insects of Uganda
Moths of Africa